Superpower is a 2023 documentary film co-directed by Sean Penn and Aaron Kaufman. It premiered at Berlinale on 17 February 2023. The film profiles Volodymyr Zelenskyy's atypical career path through the eyes of Sean Penn as he seeks to understand Ukraine's recent history. Beginning in late 2021, Penn visits Ukraine several times during the film's production. The film is produced by Vice Studios.

References

2023 documentary films
Russo-Ukrainian War films
Films about Volodymyr Zelenskyy